Simi Sara is a Canadian radio and television broadcaster, currently a talk radio host on CKNW in Vancouver, British Columbia. She succeeded Christy Clark as the station's afternoon host after Clark left the station to re-enter politics as the Premier of British Columbia.

Prior to joining CKNW, Sara was associated with CKVU-TV, including stints as a host of Breakfast Television and CityCooks, and with talk radio station CFUN before it flipped to its current sports format.

Sara was also a panelist on the 2010 edition of CBC Radio's Canada Reads, advocating for Marina Endicott's novel Good to a Fault.

References

External links
The Simi Sara Show on CKNW AM 980

Canadian television hosts
Canadian talk radio hosts
Journalists from British Columbia
Living people
Canadian people of Indian descent
Canadian women television journalists
People from Vancouver
Canadian women radio hosts
Year of birth missing (living people)
Canadian women television hosts